North Eastern MetroStars Soccer Club, commonly known as MetroStars, is an Australian semi-professional soccer club based in Adelaide, South Australia. Founded in 1994, the club currently competes in the National Premier Leagues South Australia, with matches played at the T.K. Shutter Reserve in the north-eastern suburb of Klemzig. It has generally been a strong club and has dominated in the top division of South Australian Football.

History
The club was initially known as the Metro Knights before a name change to the North Eastern MetroStars in 1998.

It started playing in Division 2 of the Saturday Amateur league in 1995, won promotion into Division 1, and quickly became the dominant side in the league.

The club entered the SASF State League in 1999 and won promotion to the Premier League in its first season.

MetroStars has subsequently cemented its position in the top South Australian football league and has developed into one of the league's leading clubs. During the formation of the FFSA and the Super League, MetroStars supported the federation, and in early 2006 was the first club to become a member.

They have recently become a more dominant force in the Super League over the last few years winning in both the senior and reserves squads. They have also produced young talents such as Jason Spagnuolo, Fabian Barbiero and Francesco Monterosso, all who have been recruited by Adelaide United, whilst Adriano Pellegrino and Shane Smeltz have gone onto other A-League clubs' books.

On 25 August 2012 they won the Federation Cup final against Para Hills Knights for the third time.

In September 2012, the club won its third League championship. MetroStars won back to back National Premier Leagues South Australia Minor Premierships in 2013 and 2014.

In October 2014, MetroStars defeated New South Wales outfit Bonnyrigg White Eagles 1–0 to claim the NPL National Championship.

In June 2016, MetroStars defeated Adelaide Comets 1-0 at Hindmarsh Stadium to win the FFSA Federation Cup and qualify for the FFA Cup.

In June 2017, MetroStars defeated Adelaide City 2-0 at Hindmarsh Stadium to win the FFSA Federation Cup and qualify for the FFA Cup Round of 32 for the third year running.

Current squad

Non-playing staff

Ref:

Notable former players
* List of professional footballers who have played for the club.

 Adam van Dommele
 Adriano Pellegrino
 Christian Esposito
 Fabian Barbiero
 Francesco Monterosso
 Jason Spagnuolo
 Liam Wooding
 Louis Brain
 Michael Matricciani
 Scott Tunbridge
 Travis Dodd
 Shane Smeltz
 James Troisi

Club honours
2014 National Premier Leagues Champions
First Division League Champions | 2004, 2009, 2012
First Division Minor Premiers | 2003, 2004, 2005, 2009, 2010, 2011, 2013, 2014
FFSA Federation Cup Champions  | 2004, 2008, 2012, 2016, 2017
Preseason Champions | 2003, 2008, 2011

Ref:

References

External links
 Official Website

National Premier Leagues clubs
Soccer clubs in South Australia
Association football clubs established in 1994
1994 establishments in Australia
Soccer clubs in Adelaide